Felipe Checa was a Spanish painter active in Badajoz during the nineteenth-century.

References

19th-century Spanish painters
19th-century Spanish male artists
Year of birth missing
Year of death missing
Place of birth missing
Place of death missing
People from Badajoz